Eye of the Needle is a 1981 British spy film directed by Richard Marquand and starring Donald Sutherland and Kate Nelligan. Written by Stanley Mann, it is based on the 1978 novel of the same title by Ken Follett.

The film is about a German Nazi spy in the United Kingdom during World War II who discovers vital information about the upcoming D-Day invasion and his attempt to return to Germany while he is stranded with a family on the isolated (fictional) Storm Island, off the coast of Scotland.

Plot
Henry Faber is a cold and emotionless German sleeper agent nicknamed "the Needle" because he prefers to kill with a stiletto. While spying in England, he obtains critical information about the Allies' plans for the Invasion of Normandy, but is unable to transmit the information, and British intelligence in London, knowing that Faber's discoveries could foil D-Day, are hounding his every move. Faber heads to Scotland for a rendezvous with a U-boat, but fierce weather strands him on Storm Island. On the island he meets Lucy, a beautiful young woman; her disabled husband, David; their young son Joe; and an elderly, alcoholic shepherd named Tom, the only other person on the island. Tom runs the lighthouse, with the island's only two-way radio.

A passionate romance develops overnight between Faber and Lucy because of the estrangement she has with her husband after a car crash on their honeymoon, which left him confined to a wheelchair, embittered and legless. David becomes suspicious of Faber when he discovers he is carrying a film canister. When questioned about the film, Faber ruthlessly kills David by throwing him off a cliff, and then Tom as he tries to contact the U-boat using the shepherd's radio. Faber lies to Lucy to explain David's absence, claiming David has been drinking with Tom, as is often the case. However, Lucy soon finds her husband's body on the rocky shoreline and, lying to Faber, manages to flee with Joe.  When Faber realizes she knows, he pursues her. Lucy reaches the radio at Tom's lighthouse, contacts the mainland and is told that help will be sent immediately, but in the meantime it is vital for her to destroy the transmitter. Lucy, alone and terrified, refuses.

When Faber arrives, Lucy tries to fight him off, but Faber takes Joe hostage, forcing her to allow him access to the radio. He begins using the radio to report to the U-boat which has been waiting for him off the coast of Storm Island. But as he attempts to impart the intelligence he has gathered, Lucy realizes his true agenda and blows the lighthouse's fuse by inserting her hand into a light socket, rendering the transmitter useless and Faber's vital information unheard. Despite what she has done, Faber doesn't murder her, but strides towards the shoreline cliffs to reach the arranged U-boat pickup.

Lucy, now fully aware of the stakes involved, runs out after Faber with her husband's revolver. She implores him to stop, but when he does not desist, she fatally shoots him before he can reach the submarine. Soon afterward, the British intelligence agent who was chasing Faber before he fled London arrives with the police. He encounters a despondent Lucy, Faber's body, and the fleeing German submarine.

Cast

 Donald Sutherland as Henry Faber
 Kate Nelligan as Lucy Rose
 Ian Bannen as Inspector Godliman
 Christopher Cazenove as David Rose
 Stephen MacKenna as Lieutenant 
 Philip Martin Brown as Billy Parkin
 George Belbin as Lucy's Father 
 Faith Brook as Lucy's Mother 
 Barbara Graley as David's Mother 
 Arthur Lovegrove as Peterson 
 Barbara Ewing as Mrs. Garden 
 Patrick Connor as Inspector Harris
 David Hayman as Canter 
 Alex McCrindle as Tom
 John Bennett as Kleinmann
 Sam Kydd as Lock Keeper 
 John Paul as Home Guard Captain
 Bill Nighy as Squadron Leader Blenkinsop
 Jonathan and Nicholas Haley (twins) as Joe (David and Lucy's son)
 Allan Surtees as Colonel Terry
 Rik Mayall as Sailor On Train
 Rupert Frazer as Muller

Production
The Storm Island scenes were shot over eight weeks on the Isle of Mull, in the Inner Hebrides. The distinctive Connel Bridge appears in the film, and some of the location filming was shot at Blackbushe Airport, Yateley, and also in London.

Reception
Roger Ebert "admired the movie" and stated that it "resembles nothing so much as one of those downbeat, plodding, quietly horrifying, and sometimes grimly funny war movies that used to be made by the British film industry, back when there was a British film industry." George Lucas was impressed by the film and hired director Richard Marquand to helm 1983’s Return of the Jedi. On Rotten Tomatoes, 83% out of 18 critics gave the film positive reviews.

References

External links
 
 
 
 
 

1981 films
British spy thriller films
Films based on British novels
Films based on thriller novels
Films directed by Richard Marquand
Films set in the 1940s
Films set in England
Films set in Scotland
Films set on fictional islands
Films shot in Argyll and Bute
Films shot in Hampshire
Films shot in London
Films shot in Surrey
Operation Overlord films
1980s spy thriller films
United Artists films
World War II spy films
Films scored by Miklós Rózsa
Adaptations of works by Ken Follett
Films with screenplays by Stanley Mann
British World War II films
1980s English-language films
1980s British films